Charles O'Meara (March 13, 1953 – October 20, 2018) better known as C.W. Vrtacek, was an American multi-instrumentalist and composer. He was a founding member of Forever Einstein and group member with Biota.

Career 
Vrtacek took up guitar at the age of 11, and played in the band Dancing Lessons before starting Forever Einstein with Dancing Lessons drummer John Roulat.

Vrtacek claimed to be influenced by anything from rock, folk, jazz, blues, ska, punk, avant garde, classical, to Irish music. He also cited unorthodox things such as church hymns, cartoon music, and the sounds made by pinball machines as being inspirational. His solo music drew equally from the dissonances of Stockhausen and Varese as well as the melodies of French impressionists such as Erik Satie and Maurice Ravel, and also used tape loops.

In 2013, Vrtacek, along with Nick Didkovsky of Doctor Nerve, conceived and released the "$100 Guitar Project", a recorded project based upon the "journey" of a guitar purchased from a secondhand music shop for $100 that passed through the hands of over 65 players, each of whom recorded a piece with it and then signed it, in turn passing it along to the next player to do the same. The two-CD set, released on Bridge Records, features performances by such noted guitarists and musicians as Alex Skolnick, Fred Frith, Nels Cline, and many others.

Discography 

Solo

Forever Einstein

with Biota

Collaboration

References

External links
C.W. Vrtacek at Cuneiform Records
Forever Einstein

2018 deaths
1953 births
People from Old Saybrook, Connecticut
Guitarists from Connecticut
American male guitarists
20th-century American guitarists
20th-century American male musicians